The following is a list of North Indian Ocean tropical cyclones from 1900 to 1909. Records from before the 1970s were extremely unreliable, and storms that stayed at sea were often only reported by ship reports.

1902
In May 1902, a cyclonic storm struck the coast in the vicinity of Karachi.
5 Cyclones formed in the Arabian Sea, The most on record (Tied with 2019)

1907
In June 1907, a tropical storm struck the coast near Karachi.

See also
 1900s Australian region cyclone seasons
 1900–1940 South Pacific cyclone seasons
 1900–1950 South-West Indian Ocean cyclone seasons
Atlantic hurricane seasons: 1900, 1901, 1902, 1903, 1904, 1905, 1906, 1907, 1908, 1909
Eastern Pacific hurricane seasons: 1900, 1901, 1902, 1903, 1904, 1905, 1906, 1907, 1908, 1909
Western Pacific typhoon seasons: 1900, 1901, 1902, 1903, 1904, 1905, 1906, 1907, 1908, 1909

References

North Indian Ocean cyclone seasons
North Indian Ocean cyclone